Redhead is a coastal suburb of the City of Lake Macquarie, Greater Newcastle, New South Wales, Australia  south of Newcastle's central business district on the Pacific Ocean. It was named for the appearance of its headland, Redhead Bluff, when viewed from the sea.

History

The Aboriginal people, in this area, the Awabakal, were the first people of this land.

Early industries included a banana orchard and mining. A mine explosion killed five people in 1926. The suburb was developed in the late 1940s. The first school opened in 1908.

The railway line that connected Redhead with Newcastle and Belmont was closed in 1971. It was converted to a popular walking and cycling path called the Fernleigh Track. It was opened in 2009.

The suburb is best known for its beach which is a popular surfing location in Newcastle.

Over the past few years the suburb has been plagued by a number of fires, including in 2013.

References

External links
 History of Redhead (Lake Macquarie City Library)

Suburbs of Lake Macquarie